Gisken Armand Lillo-Stenberg (born  26 November 1962) is a Norwegian actress. She is the daughter of actor Eilif Armand, and sister of Merete Armand and Frøydis Armand, both actresses. She debuted on stage at the age of fourteen, at Den Nationale Scene, and has been working at Nationaltheatret since 1988. There she has performed in plays such as Henrik Ibsen's A Doll's House and Anton Chekhov's Three Sisters. She has also played in several movies, such as Insomnia (1997) and Evas Øye (1999), as well as roles in television, in series like Fox Grønland (2001) and Kodenavn Hunter (2007).

Armand is married to Ole Lillo-Stenberg, brother of musician Lars Lillo-Stenberg, and the couple have two children.

Select filmography
 1994: Ti kniver i hjertet
 1995: Kristin Lavransdatter
 1997: Insomnia
 1999: Evas øye
 2004: Den som frykter ulven
 2005: Ved kongens bord (TV)
 2007: Kodenavn Hunter (TV)
 2007: Størst av alt (TV)
 2017: Askeladden - I Dovregubbens Hall
 2021: HAN

References

External links

1962 births
Living people
Norwegian child actresses
Norwegian stage actresses
Norwegian film actresses
Norwegian television actresses